The 2012 European Judo Championships were held at the Traktor Ice Arena in Chelyabinsk, Russia, from 26 to 29 April 2012.

Medal overview

Men

Women

Medal table

Results overview

Men

–60 kg

–66 kg

–73 kg

–81 kg

–90 kg

–100 kg

+100 kg

Teams

Women

–48 kg

–52 kg

–57 kg

–63 kg

–70 kg

–78 kg

+78 kg

Teams

References

External links
 Official website
 Official website of the European Judo Union
 Team results

 
European Championships
European Judo Championships
Judo Championships
Judo, European Championships
Sport in Chelyabinsk
Judo competitions in Russia
International sports competitions hosted by Russia
Judo, European Championships